Koffi Sebastien Edgard Dakoi (born 26 August 1999) is an Ivorian footballer who plays for Tigres UANL. Mainly a defensive midfielder, he can also play as a right back.

Club career
Born in Agboville, Dakoi joined Tigres UANL on 8 September 2017, from local side Ivoire Academie. Assigned to Tigres Premier, he made his senior debut on 6 January 2018 by starting in a 1–1 home draw against Monarcas Morelia Premier.

On 28 March 2018, Dakoi was loaned to Peruvian Primera División side Universidad San Martín until the end of the year. He made his professional debut three days later, coming on as a second-half substitute in a 1–1 home draw against Comerciantes Unidos.

Dakoi scored his first professional goal on 25 November 2018, netting the opener in a 1–1 home draw against FBC Melgar.

References

External links

1999 births
Living people
People from Agboville
Ivorian footballers
Association football midfielders
Liga Premier de México players
Tigres UANL footballers
Peruvian Primera División players
Club Deportivo Universidad de San Martín de Porres players
Ivory Coast under-20 international footballers
Ivorian expatriate footballers
Expatriate footballers in Mexico
Expatriate footballers in Peru
Ivorian expatriate sportspeople in Mexico